The 2015 Wealden District Council election took place on 7 May 2015 to elect members of the Wealden District Council in England. It was held on the same day as other local elections.

Results

By-elections between 2015 and 2019

Hellingly
A by-election was held in Hellingly on 29 October 2015 after the resignation of Conservative councillor Paul Soane, who stood in the by-election as an independent. The seat was gained by Liberal Democrats candidate David White.

Crowborough East
A by-election was held in Crowborough East on 21 January 2016 after the death of Conservative councillor Peter Cowie. The seat was won by Conservative candidate Philip Lunn.

Chiddingly and East Hoathly
A by-election was held in Chiddingly and East Hoathly on 20 July 2017 after the disqualification of Conservative councillor Barby Dashwood-Morris due to non-attendance. The seat was won by Conservative candidate David Watts.

References

2015 English local elections
May 2015 events in the United Kingdom
2015
2010s in East Sussex